Gabriel Pigrée (born 18 March 1985) is a French born international footballer who plays as a forward for French Guiana.

International career
Pigrée has been capped at full international level by Reunion and French Guiana. He was the competition's top-scorer in the 2014 Caribbean Cup qualification stage, scoring eight goals for French Guiana, including a hat-trick against Turks and Caicos Islands.

International goals

References

External links
 
 

Living people
French Guiana international footballers
French Guianan footballers
Réunion international footballers
People from Sarcelles
Expatriate footballers in Réunion
French footballers
1985 births
Dual internationalists (football)
2014 Caribbean Cup players
Trélissac FC players
US Lège Cap Ferret players
US Sainte-Marienne players
Association football forwards
Footballers from Val-d'Oise